Nathan Holder (born 2 May 2002) is a professional footballer who plays as a defensive midfielder for Bulgarian First League club Spartak Varna on loan from Levski Sofia. Born in the Netherlands, he represents the Curaçao national team.

Youth and club career
Born in Amsterdam, Holder started playing football at Zeeburgia, at the age of 14. He spent three further years in the youth teams of Utrecht and Groningen. On 29 June 2022, Holder moved to Bulgaria, signing a 3-year deal with First Professional League club Levski Sofia. He was initially assigned to the reserve team, Levski II, which plays in the Third League. But duo to rules changes about foreigners playing in the second team, he was unable to play for them. In December 2022 he was sent on loan to Spartak Varna until end of the season.

National team career
Holder made his debut for the senior Curaçao national team on 6 October 2021, in a friendly match with Bahrain.

References

External links
 
 Profile at AVV Zeeburgia
 Profile at Levski Academy

2002 births
Living people
Curaçao footballers
Curaçao youth international footballers
Association football midfielders
First Professional Football League (Bulgaria) players
PFC Spartak Varna players
PFC Levski Sofia players
Dutch footballers
Dutch people of Curaçao descent
Footballers from Amsterdam
FC Groningen players
FC Utrecht players
Dutch expatriate footballers
Dutch expatriate sportspeople in Bulgaria
Expatriate footballers in Bulgaria
Curaçao international footballers
Curaçao expatriate footballers
Curaçao expatriate sportspeople in Bulgaria